Police and Thieves is an album by Junior Murvin and backing band The Upsetters, released in 1977. Along with The Heptones' Party Time and Max Romeo's War Ina Babylon, this album is considered part of a Black Ark Lee 'Scratch' Perry-produced "holy trinity".

Track listing
All tracks composed by Junior Murvin and Lee "Scratch" Perry; except where indicated

Original LP 

"Roots Train"
"Police and Thieves"
"Solomon" (Murvin)
"Rescue Jah Children"
"Tedious"
"False Teachin" (Perry)
"Easy Task" (Murvin)
"Lucifer"
"Workin' in the Cornfield" (Perry)
"I Was Appointed" (Murvin)

2003 CD re-release 

"Roots Train"
"Police and Thieves"
"Solomon"
"Rescue Jah Children"
"Tedious"
"False Teachin"
"Easy Task"
"Lucifer"
"Working in the Cornfield"
"I Was Appointed"
"Childhood Sweetheart" (Murvin)
"Bad Weed" (Discomix)
"Roots Train" (Discomix)
"Memories" (B-side of "Police and Thieves")
"Rasta Get Ready" (Curtis Mayfield's "People Get Ready")

Personnel
Junior Murvin - vocals
Cedric Myton, George Faith - vocals
Robert "Billy" Johnson - guitar
Boris Gardiner - bass
Winston Wright, Errol "Tarzan" Nelson - keyboards
"Dirty" Harry Hall, Herman Marquis, "Deadly" Headley Bennett - horns
Dillinger - additional vocals on "Roots Train" discomix
Tony Wright - cover illustration

References

Junior Murvin albums
Island Records albums
1977 albums
Albums produced by Lee "Scratch" Perry